Dactylorhiza cruenta, the flecked marsh orchid, is a Palearctic orchid.

It is a subspecies of D. incarnata on the Kew List.

References

External links 
  Den virtuella floran - Distribution

cruenta